The 2022 Chevron Championship was the 51st Chevron Championship LPGA golf tournament, held March 31 through April 3, 2022, at the Dinah Shore Tournament Course of Mission Hills Country Club in Rancho Mirage, California. The tournament was in its first year with Chevron Corporation as the title sponsor and its 40th year as a major championship. The Golf Channel televised the event for the 12th consecutive year.

Jennifer Kupcho won her first LPGA tournament with a total of 274 (14-under-par), by two strokes over Jessica Korda. This was the final playing of the tournament at Mission Hills, due to the tournament being moved to a new venue in 2023 as part of a new title sponsorship agreement.

Field
Players who have qualified for the event are listed below. Players are listed under the first category in which they qualified; additional qualifying categories are shown in parentheses.

1. Active LPGA Tour Hall of Fame members (must have participated in ten official LPGA Tour tournaments within the 12 months prior to the commitment deadline)

Inbee Park (2,3,4,5,7,8)

2. Winners of all previous Chevron Championship

Ko Jin-young (3,4,5,7,8)
Lydia Ko (4,5,7,8)
Mirim Lee (4,5)
Stacy Lewis (4,7)
Brittany Lincicome (7)
Pernilla Lindberg (5)
Ryu So-yeon (7,8)
Patty Tavatanakit (4,5,6,7,8,11)
Lexi Thompson (4,6,7,8,10)

 Yani Tseng, Karrie Webb did not play

3. Winners of the U.S. Women's Open, Women's PGA Championship, Women's British Open, and The Evian Championship in the previous five years

Hannah Green (4,5,7,8)
Georgia Hall (4,6,7,8,10)
Ariya Jutanugarn (4,7,8)
Danielle Kang (4,5,6,7,8,10)
Kim A-lim (7)
In-Kyung Kim
Kim Sei-young (4,5,7,8)
Lee Jeong-eun (6,7,8)
Minjee Lee (4,6,7,8)
Anna Nordqvist (6,7,8,10)
Park Sung-hyun (4)
Sophia Popov (7,10)
Yuka Saso (6,7,8)
Hinako Shibuno
Angela Stanford (4,7)

 Nelly Korda (4,5,6,7,8,10) did not play

4. Winners of official LPGA Tour tournaments from the 2019 ANA Inspiration through the week immediately preceding the 2022 Chevron Championship

Pajaree Anannarukarn (7)
Céline Boutier (7,8,10)
Matilda Castren (7,10)
Austin Ernst (7,10)
Ally Ewing (5,7,8,10)
Nasa Hataoka (6,7,8)
Brooke Henderson (5,7,8)
Hsu Wei-ling (7)
Moriya Jutanugarn (5,7)
Kim Hyo-joo (6,7,8)
Cheyenne Knight
Jessica Korda (7,8,10)
Bronte Law
Gaby López (7)
Nanna Koerstz Madsen (5,6,7,10)
Leona Maguire (7,8,10)
Ryann O'Toole (5,7)
Park Hee-young
Mel Reid (5,7)
Madelene Sagström (6,7)
Atthaya Thitikul (6,8,9-LET)

 Ai Suzuki, M. J. Hur, Jang Ha-na (8) did not play

5. All players who finished in the top-20 in the previous year's Chevron Championship

Charley Hull (7,10)
Megan Khang (6,7,10)
Christina Kim
Lee Mi-hyang
Yu Liu (7)
Stephanie Meadow
Gabriela Ruffels

6. All players who finished in the top-5 of the previous year's U.S. Women's Open, Women's PGA Championship, Women's British Open and The Evian Championship

Ayaka Furue (8,9-JLPGA)
Giulia Molinaro (7)
Yealimi Noh (7,10)
Lizette Salas (7,8,10)

 Shanshan Feng (7) did not play

7. Top-80 on the previous year's season-ending LPGA Tour Race to the CME Globe points list

Marina Alex
Brittany Altomare (10)
Aditi Ashok
Ashleigh Buhai
Chella Choi
Chun In-gee (8)
Carlota Ciganda (10)
Cydney Clanton
Jenny Coleman
Perrine Delacour
Jaye Marie Green
Mina Harigae (10)
Esther Henseleit
Ji Eun-hee
Sarah Kemp
Jennifer Kupcho (10)
Alison Lee
Lee Jeong-eun
Min Lee
Lin Xiyu
Caroline Masson
Wichanee Meechai
Su-Hyun Oh
Amy Olson
Sarah Schmelzel 
Jenny Shin
Jennifer Song
Lauren Stephenson
Thidapa Suwannapura
Emma Talley
Albane Valenzuela
Lindsey Weaver-Wright
Amy Yang
Angel Yin

 Elizabeth Szokol did not play

8. Top-30 on the Women's World Golf Rankings as of a March 7, 2022

 Mone Inami (9-JLPGA), Park Min-ji (9-KLPGA) did not play

9. Top-2 players from the previous year's season-ending Ladies European Tour Order of Merit, LPGA of Japan Tour Order of Merit and LPGA of Korea Tour money list

Pia Babnik
Lim Hee-jeong

10. Members of the European and United States Solheim Cup teams in 2021

Emily Kristine Pedersen

11. Top-15 players plus ties on the current year LPGA Tour Race to the CME Globe points list at the end of the last official tournament prior to the current Chevron Championship, not otherwise qualified above, provided such players are within the top-80 positions on the list at the beginning of the tournament competition

An Na-rin
Choi Hye-jin
Allison Emrey
Jodi Ewart Shadoff
Yaeeun Hong
Janie Jackson
Maude-Aimee Leblanc
Annie Park
Pornanong Phatlum
Paula Reto
Pauline Roussin-Bouchard
Kelly Tan
Alana Uriell
Lilia Vu

12. Previous year's Louise Suggs Rolex Rookie of the Year

13. Previous year's U.S. Women's Amateur champion, provided she is still an amateur at the beginning of tournament competition

14. Any LPGA Member who did not compete in the previous year's Chevron Championship major due to injury, illness or maternity, who subsequently received a medical/maternity extension of membership from the LPGA in the previous calendar year, provided they were otherwise qualified to compete in the previous year's Chevron Championship

Charlotte Thomas
Sakura Yokomine

15. Up to six sponsor invitations for top-ranked amateur players

Isabella Fierro (a) 
Gurleen Kaur (a) 
Natasha Andrea Oon (a) 
Bohyun Park (a) 
Brooke Seay (a)

Round summaries

First round
Thursday, March 31, 2022

Jennifer Kupcho and Minjee Lee shared the lead with opening rounds of 66, 6-under-par. Defending champion Patty Tavatanakit was a stroke behind in third place, with a group of six players a further shot behind on 68.

Second round
Friday, April 1, 2022

Hinako Shibuno scored a second-round 66 to lead after 36 holes on 135, 9-under-par. Jennifer Kupcho, Annie Park and Patty Tavatanakit were a stroke behind, tied for second place.

Third round
Saturday, April 2, 2022

Jennifer Kupcho set a 54-hole record in the tournament in having a 16-under-par total (200) with her eight-under-par 64. She beat the previous total by two strokes. She led by six strokes over defending champion Patty Tavatanakit at 206.

Final round
Sunday, April 3, 2022

Jennifer Kupcho won the tournament with a 14-under-par total of 274, for her first LPGA Tour win. Her final round of 74 included bogeys at the last two holes. Jessica Korda finished second after a final round of 69, while Pia Babnik rose to third place after a 6-under-par 66.

References

External links

Coverage on the LPGA Tour official site

Chevron Championship
Golf in California
Chevron Championship
Chevron Championship
Chevron Championship
Chevron Championship